
This is a list of postal codes in Canada where the first letter is V. Postal codes beginning with V are located within the Canadian province of British Columbia. Only the first three characters are listed, corresponding to the Forward Sortation Area. The V postal code area is currently the most utilized in Canada, with only five of the 180 available urban FSAs not yet assigned.

Canada Post provides a free postal code look-up tool on its website, via its mobile apps for such smartphones as the iPhone and BlackBerry, and sells hard-copy directories and CD-ROMs. Many vendors also sell validation tools, which allow customers to properly match addresses and postal codes. Hard-copy directories can also be consulted in all post offices, and some libraries.

British Columbia - 193 FSAs

Urban

Rural

References

Canada Post map of Vancouver-area postal codes

Communications in British Columbia
V
Postal codes V